Bay Village is a city in western Cuyahoga County, Ohio, United States. Located along the southern shore of Lake Erie, the city is a western suburb of Cleveland and a part of the Cleveland metropolitan area. The population was 16,163 at the 2020 census.

History

Before the first European-Americans arrived in the area around 1600, Erie Indians lived in Bay Village and the surrounding areas. The most important Indian trail in Ohio is present-day Lake Road, which is a main road in Bay Village. In that same century, what is now Bay Village, along with Avon Lake, Avon, and Westlake, was part of one territory. This territory was later called by the whites in a native language, "Xeuma", a term roughly meaning "those who came before us".

The area belonged to Connecticut until 1803, the year in which Ohio became a state. Before 1803, the Connecticut Land Company sold and gave away land in the area to Connecticut citizens, who had lost their homes and farms during the Revolutionary War. Because many had lost their homes to fires during the war, this new area was named "the Firelands". One surveyor with the Connecticut Land Company was Moses Cleaveland. He came with his friends on horseback from Connecticut and stopped at the Cuyahoga River with his Indian guides in July 1796. The land was then divided into five townships. The area between the Cuyahoga River and The Firelands to the west was laid out in 1806. 

Joseph Cahoon settled in what is now Bay Village in 1810. Bay Village was part of the original Dover Township, which comprised present-day Bay Village, Westlake, and portions of North Olmstead. By the turn of the 20th century, Dover would have a permanent population of roughly 2,200, with part-time residents who owned summer cottages on Lake Erie adding to this total in the summer months. In 1901, landowners in northern Dover forced an election to split from Dover Township, forming Bay Township. In 1903, Bay Village was incorporated, and the first mayor and council were elected. Ida Marie Cahoon, the last Cahoon descendant, died in 1917, leaving the family home and 115 acres of land to the city which is known today as Cahoon Memorial Park. John Huntington, one of the original partners of Standard Oil Company, donated his summer estate to the Cleveland Metroparks, which would later become the Huntington Reservation. Bay Village became a city on January 1, 1950, when it had reached a population of 6,917.

Geography

Bay Village is located at  (41.484193, −81.926581).

Bay Village is home to the Cleveland Metroparks Huntington Reservation. Lake Erie Nature & Science Center and BAYarts are also located within the reservation. Bay Village is located in Ohio's 9th congressional district.

Demographics

2020 census 
At the 2020 census there were 16,163 people in 6,021 households, including 4,291 families, in the city. The population density was 3,536.8 inhabitants per square mile (1,362.8/km²). There 6,466 housing units at an average density of 1,414.9 per square mile (546.6/km²). The racial makeup of the city was 93.8% White, 0.6% African American, >0.1% Native American, 1.0% Asian, 0.5% from other races, and 4.0% from two or more races. Hispanic or Latino of any race were 2.7%.

Of the 6,021 households 24.6% had children under the age of 18 living with them, 61.3% were married couples living together, 21.6% had a female householder with no spouse present, 13.1% had a male householder with no spouse present, and 4% were non-families.

The median age was 43.4 years. 26.2% of residents were under the age of 18. The gender makeup of the city was 49.6% male and 51.4% female.

2010 census
At the 2010 census there were 15,651 people in 6,198 households, including 4,441 families, in the city. The racial makeup of the city was 97.0% White, 0.5% African American, 0.1% Native American, 0.9% Asian, 0.3% from other races, and 1.1% from two or more races. Hispanic or Latino of any race were 1.6%.

Of the 6,198 households 33.7% had children under the age of 18 living with them, 61.7% were married couples living together, 7.7% had a female householder with no husband present, 2.2% had a male householder with no wife present, and 28.3% were non-families. 25.0% of households were one person and 11.1% were one person aged 65 or older. The average household size was 2.50 and the average family size was 3.02.

The median age was 43.4 years. 25.4% of residents were under the age of 18; 4.4% were between the ages of 18 and 24; 22.6% were from 25 to 44; 32% were from 45 to 64; and 15.5% were 65 or older. The gender makeup of the city was 47.5% male and 52.5% female.

Of the city's population over the age of 25, 56% hold a bachelor's degree or higher.

2000 census
At the 2000 census there were 16,087 people in 6,239 households, including 4,685 families, in the city. The population density was 3,473.4 people per square mile (1,341.5/km). There were 6,401 housing units at an average density of 1,382.1 per square mile (533.8/km). The racial makeup of the city was 89.0% White, 9.3% African American, 0.01% Native American, 0.7% Asian, 0.01% Pacific Islander, 0.2% from other races, and 0.7% from two or more races. Hispanic or Latino of any race were 1.0%. 21.6% were of German, 20.4% Irish, 10.6% English, 8.6% Italian and 5.1% Polish ancestry according to Census 2000.

Of the 6,239 households, 34.1% had children under the age of 18 living with them, 65.8% were married couples living together, 17.4% had a female householder with no husband present, and 24.9% were non-families. 22.1% of households were one person and 9.6% were one person aged 65 or older. The average household size was 2.55 and the average family size was 3.01.

The age distribution was 25.9% under the age of 18, 4.4% from 18 to 24, 26.4% from 25 to 44, 29.0% from 45 to 64, and 14.4% 65 or older. The median age was 41.1 years. For every 100 females, there were 92.1 males. For every 100 females age 18 and over, there were 88.9 males.

The median household income was $70,397 and the median family income was $33,686. Males had a median income of $36,061 versus $18,746 for females. The per capita income for the city was $35,318. About 2.0% of families and 3.0% of the population were below the poverty line.

Education
There are about 2,500 students in the Bay Village City School District, and four school buildings. Normandy Elementary serves grades K–2, Westerly Elementary serves grades 3–4, Bay Middle School serves grades 5–8, and Bay High School serves grades 9–12.

In 2019, Bay Village City Schools were ranked as the tenth-best district in the state of Ohio.

Notable people

 John Elliott (born 1984), musician in the band Emeralds
 Rich Fields (born 1960), broadcaster and popular announcer of The Price Is Right
 Jonathan Freeman (born 1950), actor and singer
 Brad Friedel (born 1971), goalkeeper for Tottenham Hotspur, and retired US National Team goalkeeper
 Otto Graham (1921–2003) Pro Football Hall of Fame quarterback for the Cleveland Browns
 Patricia Heaton (born 1958), award-winning actress from The Middle and Everybody Loves Raymond
 Karen Kresge (born 1948), former star solo ice skating performer for Ice Follies and Holiday on Ice, currently ice skating choreographer, ice show director and producer
 Amy Mihaljevic (1978–1989), kidnapping and homicide victim
 Eliot Ness (1903–1957), Cleveland police investigator and Federal agent
 Richard Patrick (born 1968), co-founder of the alternative rock band Filter and former member of Nine Inch Nails
 Richard North Patterson (born 1947), Best-selling American fiction writer and political commentator
 Lili Reinhart (born 1996), actress, known for portraying Betty Cooper on the TV series Riverdale. She was born in Cleveland, Ohio, but grew up in Bay Village.
 Sam Sheppard (1923–1970), convicted in controversial 1954 murder case
 George Steinbrenner (1930–2010), former owner of the New York Yankees
Kate Voegele (born 1986), singer and actress 
 Dave Zastudil (born 1978), former NFL punter

Recognition
In 2012, Family Circle ranked Bay Village as one of the 10 Best Towns for Families.

References

Further reading
 Bay Village: A Way of Life, Bay Village Historical Society, 1974,

External links

 City website
 Bay Village Schools

 
Cities in Ohio
Cities in Cuyahoga County, Ohio
Cleveland metropolitan area
1903 establishments in Ohio
Ohio populated places on Lake Erie